Douglas Philp  (born 31 December 1967) is a Scottish chemist who is currently Professor in Chemistry at the University of St Andrews. He was previously a Reader in Physical Organic Chemistry at the University of Birmingham.

Philp graduated from the University of Aberdeen with a BSc in Chemistry in 1989 and completed his PhD in 1992 at the University of Birmingham with a thesis entitled Self-Assembly in Chemical Systems.

He was awarded the Saltire Society Scottish Science Award in 2005 and the Royal Society of Chemistry Bader Award in 2009. He was made a Fellow of the Royal Society of Edinburgh in 2021.

Philp has an h-index of 46 according to Google Scholar.

References

1967 births
Living people
Alumni of the University of Aberdeen
Alumni of the University of Birmingham
Academics of the University of Birmingham
Academics of the University of St Andrews
Fellows of the Royal Society of Edinburgh
Scientists from Glasgow